Sid Freudenstein (born May 18, 1945) is an American gymnast. He competed in eight events at the 1968 Summer Olympics.

References

External links
 

1945 births
Living people
American male artistic gymnasts
Olympic gymnasts of the United States
Gymnasts at the 1968 Summer Olympics
Sportspeople from New Orleans
California Golden Bears men's gymnasts